Halmeu is a commune of 4,845 inhabitants situated in Satu Mare County, Romania. It is composed of five villages:

Until World War II, the village was home to a Jewish community, which numbered 479 souls in 1877. The commune included two other villages until 2005, when they were split off to form Porumbeşti Commune.

Demographics

In 1910, 97.6% reported Hungarian as their primary language. The religious make-up was 1196 Calvinists (34.6%), 1061 Jewish (30.7%) and 613 Roman Catholic (17.7%).

Ethnic groups (2011 census): 
Romanians: 57%
Hungarians: 36%
Roma: 3%

57% had Romanian as first language, and 39% Hungarian.

References

 Memorial book to the Communities of Halmin-Turt (in Hebrew)

Communes in Satu Mare County
Romania–Ukraine border crossings